Brooke–Fordyce syndrome is a condition characterized by multiple trichoepitheliomas.

See also 
 List of cutaneous neoplasms associated with systemic syndromes
 List of cutaneous conditions

References 

 
 

Epidermal nevi, neoplasms, and cysts